Forsythe is a surname.

Notable people and characters with the name include:

People
Abe Forsythe (born 1981), Australian actor
Alexandra Illmer Forsythe (1918–1980), American computer scientist
Clifford Forsythe (1929–2000), Northern Ireland politician
Diana E. Forsythe (1947–1997), American anthropologist
Drew Forsythe (born 1949), Australian entertainer
George Forsythe (1917–1972), American mathematician and computer scientist
Gerald Forsythe co-owner of Champ Car World Series and owner of the Forsythe Championship Racing Team
Henderson Forsythe (1917–2006), American actor
Jack A. "Pee Wee" Forsythe, American college football player and coach
John Forsythe (1918–2010), American actor
Keith Forsythe (1927–2003), New Zealand field athlete
Linda Forsythe (born 1950), American model
Mark Forsythe (born 1965), Northern Irish long jumper
Robert E. Forsythe, American economist
Stone Forsythe (born 1997), American football player
William Forsythe (actor) (born 1955), American actor
William Forsythe (dancer) (born 1949), American dancer and choreographer
William E. Forsythe (1881–1969), president of the Optical Society of America

Fictional characters
 Adam Forsythe, in a British soap opera
 Miss Forsythe, a minor character in Arthur Miller's Death of a Salesman
 Stacey Forsythe, one of the main characters of Dead Rising 2
 Felix Forsythe (commonly known as fmoney), one of the main characters in the movie Frenzy
 Ariana Forsythe, main character in Linore Rose Burkard's Christian romance novel, Before the Season Ends

See also
 Forsyth (surname)
 Clan Forsyth

Anglicised Scottish Gaelic-language surnames